Magen (lit. Shield) is a kibbutz in southern Israel. Located in the north-western Negev desert and covering 8,500 dunams, it falls under the jurisdiction of Eshkol Regional Council.

History
During World War I, British forces established an air base here after the withdrawal of the Turks. The kibbutz was established by immigrants from Romania on 16 August 1949. The site was on the remains the Maqam (shrine) of Sheikh Nuran, probably the site of the biblical town of Bethul (Joshua 19:4) and a battlefield during Operation Assaf in the 1948 Arab–Israeli War.

References

External links
Official website 

Kibbutzim
Kibbutz Movement
Populated places established in 1949
Gaza envelope
Populated places in Southern District (Israel)
Romanian-Jewish culture in Israel
1949 establishments in Israel